The Way I Am is the third studio album by dance-pop musician Dino, released on August 3, 1993, on EastWest Records.  Two singles were released from the album.  The first was "Ooh Child" (a cover of a song originally released in 1970 by the group The Five Stairsteps), which reached No. 27 on the Billboard Hot 100 in 1993. The second single, "Endlessly," did not chart.

Track listing

Charts 
Singles

References 

1993 albums
Dino (singer) albums